Chaillot is a quarter of Paris, France, located in the 16th arrondissement, on the Right Bank. It is adjacent to Passy to the southwest (administratively part of la Muette) and is bound by Avenue de la Grande-Armée to the north.

It is home to many of the city's wealthiest residents, and many embassies and museums.

History

Chaillot was originally a village on the outskirts of Paris. In the 16th century, Catherine de' Medici built the Château de Chaillot (no longer existing). Chaillot was incorporated into the city of Paris in 1860 by the Law of 16 June 1859. At that time, it was planned that Auteuil and Passy would form a new arrondissement that would be numbered the 13th arrondissement, but "The rich and powerful moving in did not like the number. They pulled strings and became the 16th, the unlucky association and postmark being transferred to the blameless but less influential folks around Porte d'Italie."

Landmarks
Among the landmarks of Chaillot are the Palais de Chaillot and the Jardins du Trocadéro at the Trocadéro, the Saint-Pierre de Chaillot church, the Musée Guimet, the Palais Galliera, and the Palais de Tokyo.

Education
Lübeck School is located in Chaillot.

Notable people
Marcel Proust died at his apartment 44 rue Hamelin, in Chaillot, in 1922.

In popular culture
The Madwoman of Chaillot by Jean Giraudoux is set in a café on Place de l'Alma.

References

Districts of Paris
16th arrondissement of Paris